Minister of National Education can refer to:
 Ministry of National Education (Colombia)
 Minister of National Education (France)
 Ministry of National Education (Haiti)
 Minister of National Education (Poland)
 Minister of National Education (Romania)
 Minister of National Education (South Africa)